Swimming Pool is a 2003 erotic thriller film directed by François Ozon and starring Charlotte Rampling and Ludivine Sagnier. The plot focuses on a British crime novelist, Sarah Morton, who travels to her publisher's upmarket summer house in Southern France to seek solitude in order to work on her next book. However, the arrival of Julie, who claims to be the publisher's daughter, induces complications and a subsequent crime. Both lead characters are bilingual, and the film's dialogue is a mixture of French and English.

Swimming Pool premiered at the Cannes Film Festival on 18 May 2003, and was released theatrically in France three days later with a U cinema rating, meaning it was deemed suitable for all ages. It was given a limited release in the United States that July and was edited to avoid an NC-17 rating due to its sexual content and nudity. It was subsequently released in North America on DVD in an unrated cut.

The film ignited controversy with audiences because of its ambiguous nature and unclear conclusion which can be interpreted in various ways. In France many comparisons were made with Jacques Deray's 1969 film La Piscine (The Swimming Pool), starring Romy Schneider and Alain Delon.

Plot 
Sarah Morton, a middle-aged English mystery author, who has written a successful series of detective novels, is having writer's block that is impeding her next book. Her publisher, John Bosload, offers her his country house near Lacoste, France, for some rest and relaxation. Sarah takes him up on the offer, hinting that she hopes John may visit. After becoming comfortable with the run of the spacious, sun-filled house and meeting the groundskeeper, Marcel, Sarah's quietude is disrupted by a young woman claiming to be the publisher's daughter, Julie. She shows up late one night explaining that she is taking time off from work herself. She eventually tells Sarah that her mother used to be Bosload's mistress, but that he would not leave his family.

Julie's sex life consists of one-night stands with various men, and a competition of personalities develops between the two women. At first, Sarah regards Julie as a distraction from her writing. She uses earplugs to sleep during Julie's noisy nighttime adventures, but develops a voyeuristic fascination with them, abandoning the earplugs during one of Julie's trysts. Sarah sneaks into Julie's room and steals her diary, using it in the novel she is working on. The competition comes to the fore when a local waiter, Franck, is involved. Julie wants him but he appears to prefer the more mature Sarah, having struck up a relationship with her during her frequent lunches at the bistro.

An unexpected tragedy occurs after a night of flirting among the three. After swimming together in the pool, Franck refuses to allow Julie to continue performing oral sex on him once Sarah, who watches them from the balcony, throws a rock into the water. Franck tells Julie he is leaving. The next day, Franck is missing. While investigating Franck's disappearance, Sarah is told that Julie's mother died years earlier, though Julie had spoken of her mother as if she were alive. She returns to the villa, where a confused Julie thinks Sarah is her mother and has a breakdown. Julie eventually recovers and confesses that Franck is dead because she repeatedly hit him over the head with a rock as he tried to leave her at the pool. His body is in one of the sheds.

When Marcel becomes suspicious of the mound of fresh soil where Sarah and Julie have buried Franck's body, Sarah seduces him to distract him. Julie leaves, thanking Sarah for her help and leaving her the manuscript of an unpublished novel she claims her mother wrote, which she had previously said John made her mother burn. Sarah uses the mother's manuscript in her novel.

Sarah returns to England and visits John at his publishing office with her new novel, which she anticipated he would reject, so she had it printed by another publisher. His daughter, Julia, shows up just as Sarah is leaving, but is revealed to be a different person than the girl who came to John's French house.

Cast 
 Charlotte Rampling as Sarah Morton
 Ludivine Sagnier as Julie
 Charles Dance as John Bosload
  as Franck
 Marc Fayolle as Marcel
 Mireille Mossé as Marcel's daughter
 Lauren Farrow as Julia
 Sebastian Harcombe as Terry Long
 Frances Cuka as Lady on the Underground
 Michel Fau as The First Man
 Émilie Gavois-Kahn as Waitress at Cafe

Ending interpretations 
The intentionally ambiguous ending sparked much confusion and controversy. One interpretation is that Sarah was alone at the villa the entire time. This would mean that Julie is a fiction conjured by Sarah for the purpose of her new book – also titled Swimming Pool – which she presents defiantly to Bosload at the end of the film. Ozon has said:

Release

Box office 
Swimming Pool grossed $10,130,108 in the United States and $12,311,215 internationally for a worldwide total of $22,441,323. It had a budget of €6.1 million (about US$7.8 million), meaning that it was a financial success.

Critical reception 
The film was well received and earned  "freshness" rating on Rotten Tomatoes, with most critics' praise centering on the two leads. The site's critical consensus reads, "A sensual thriller with two engaging performers demanding our undivided attention." On Metacritic, the film holds a score of 70 out of 100 based on 37 critics, indicating "generally favourable reviews".

Roger Ebert gave the film a positive review, writing, "François Ozon, the director and co-writer (with Emmanuèle Bernheim), understands as Hitchcock did the small steps by which a wrong decision grows in its wrongness into a terrifying paranoid nightmare".

Neil Smith of the BBC also praised the film, calling it a "compelling psychological melodrama" and "Hitchcockian thriller." Sarmad Iqbal of the International Policy Digest wrote that the film's "intriguing yet mystifying mix of erotica and thriller set in a part of France that is a far cry from bustling Paris makes you fall in love with it. It is not just the plot, the setting and the way actors have immaculately performed their roles will make you shower praise on this film but also the soundtrack by Philippe Rombi".

Moira Macdonald of The Seattle Times called film's director a "master of mood", while Varietys David Rooney called the film a "sophisticated [and] unpredictable mystery".

References

External links 

 
 

2003 films
2003 independent films
2003 multilingual films
2003 psychological thriller films
2000s English-language films
2000s erotic thriller films
2000s French-language films
2000s mystery thriller films
British erotic thriller films
British independent films
British multilingual films
British mystery thriller films
British psychological thriller films
English-language French films
Erotic mystery films
Films about sexual repression
Films about writers
Films directed by François Ozon
Films set in France
Films shot in France
French erotic thriller films
French independent films
French multilingual films
French mystery thriller films
French psychological thriller films
2000s British films
2000s French films